The 1991 IAAF World Race Walking Cup was held on 1 and 2 June 1991 in the streets of San Jose, California, USA.  The event was also known as IAAF Race Walking World Cup.  The course followed a loop along Park Avenue and Almaden Boulevard, north and east of the intersection.

Complete results were published.

Medallists

Results

Men's 20 km

Men's 50 km

Team (men)
The team rankings, named Lugano Trophy, combined the 20km and 50km events team results.

Women's 10 km

Team (women)

Participation
The participation of 309 athletes (218 men/91 women) from 33 countries is reported.

 (4/-)
 (10/5)
 (3/-)
 (8/3)
 (5/5)
 (6/4)
 (4/-)
 (9/3)
 (-/4)
 (7/4)
 (10/3)
 (10/4)
 (8/3)
 (7/5)
 (4/3)
 (3/3)
 (10/5)
 (5/4)
 (10/5)
 (4/-)
 (8/3)
 (-/3)
 (8/-)
 (7/-)
 (3/-)
 (5/-)
 (10/5)
 (10/5)
 (8/3)
 (8/-)
 (8/4)
 (10/5)
 (4/-)

See also
 1991 Race Walking Year Ranking

References

External links
IAAF World Race Walking Cup 1961-2006 Facts & Figures - IAAF.org

World Athletics Race Walking Team Championships
World Race Walking Cup
World Race Walking Cup
IAAF World Race Walking Cup
IAAF World Race Walking Cup
International track and field competitions hosted by the United States
Track and field in California